Yoyodyne is the name of a number of companies, both fictional and real.

Literary
Yoyodyne was introduced as a fictional defense contractor in Thomas Pynchon's V. (1963) and featured prominently in his novel The Crying of Lot 49 (1966).  Described in the latter book as "a giant of the aerospace industry," Yoyodyne was founded by World War II veteran Clayton "Bloody" Chiclitz.  The company has a large manufacturing plant in the fictional town of San Narciso, California. The name is reminiscent of several real high-tech companies, including the Gyrodyne Company of America, Teledyne and Teradyne, all of which were founded a few years before Pynchon wrote The Crying of Lot 49, and Rocketdyne, an aerospace company that manufactured, among other things, propulsion systems.

The "dyne" is the standard unit of force in the centimetre–gram–second (CGS) system of units, derived from the Greek word dynamis, meaning "power" or "force".

Other fictional uses

 The 1984 film The Adventures of Buckaroo Banzai Across the 8th Dimension used the name Yoyodyne Propulsion Systems for a defense contractor whose corporate offices feature the sign, "The future begins tomorrow". Yoyodyne is a front for a group of red Lectroid aliens, all with the first name John, that landed in New Jersey in 1938, using the panic created by Orson Welles' War of the Worlds radio play as cover.
 Numerous references in the Star Trek series, such as control panels and dedication plaques, indicate that parts of Federation starships were manufactured by Yoyodyne Propulsion Systems or YPS. Often, these notices are too small to be visible on a television screen, or can only be observed by freeze-framing. 
 Yoyodyne is a client of the law firm Wolfram & Hart on the television series Angel at the beginning in the 9th episode of the 5th season titled "Harm's Way".
 The central bus station on the television series The John Larroquette Show was constructed by Yoyodyne, one of the many Pynchon references on the series.
 Tim Powers' fantasy novel Last Call mentions Yoyodyne as a company in the Los Angeles area that "manufactures ... stuff".
 In the German miniature wargame Spacelords, House Yoyodyne is a faction with a culture almost identical to that of feudal Japan.
 In Clifford Stoll's The Cuckoo's Egg, a fictional tape drive manufactured by Yoyodyne Systems is mentioned in passing as an example ("a Foobar model 37 computer, and we're trying to hook up a Yoyodyne tape to it").
 A company named Yoyodyne is briefly mentioned in the HBO series Silicon Valley as a nod to the GNU General Public License. It appears to be a technology enterprise of some sort located in San Francisco.
 In the novel Hardwired by Walter Jon Williams, Yoyodyne is the parent company of the manufacturer of a fictional type of computer core made of liquid crystal.
 The 1990 film The NeverEnding Story II: The Next Chapter used the name Yoyodyne Corp. on a spray-paint can label, wished for by the main character.

Technical uses

In June 1991 version 2 of the open-source license GNU General Public License used the fictional company name "Yoyodyne, Inc." as an example grantor of the license.

Many technical works, such as Cricket Liu's DNS and BIND (O'Reilly), Per Cederqvist's Version Management with CVS, Jesse Vincent's RT Essentials (O'Reilly), and the GNU General Public License version 2 use Yoyodyne as a company name in their examples. The Internet domain name www.yoyodyne.com was allocated by Internet software designer TGV Inc. as a "fake" domain name for use in DNS configuration examples.

Yoyodyne was an Internet-based direct marketer, founded by Seth Godin and later joined by Mark Hurst, and acquired by Yahoo! on October 12, 1998. Godin took the name from the company in The Adventures of Buckaroo Banzai Across the 8th Dimension.

A company named Yoyodyne LLC, based in Morristown, New Jersey, is a retailer of aftermarket motorcycle parts, including self-branded clutch accessories.

See also
 Acme Corporation

Notes

Fictional companies
Thomas Pynchon
Yahoo! acquisitions
Fictional elements introduced in 1963